The women's 5000 metres race of the 2015–16 ISU Speed Skating World Cup 2, arranged in the Utah Olympic Oval, in Salt Lake City, United States, was held on November 20, 2015.

Martina Sáblíková of the Czech Republic won the race, while Natalya Voronina of Russia came second, and Ivanie Blondin of Canada came third. Carien Kleibeuker of the Netherlands won the Division B race on the best time of the day.

Results
The race took place on Friday, November 20, with Division B scheduled in the morning session, at 09:00, and Division A scheduled in the afternoon session, at 13:00.

Division A

Note: NR = national record.

Division B

Note: NR = national record.

References

Women 5000
2
ISU